Bridget McKeever (born 2 February 1983), also known as Bridget Cleland, is a former Ireland women's field hockey international. Between 2003 and 2010 she made 150 senior appearances for Ireland. She also captained Ireland.

Early years and education
McKeever was educated at Dalriada School and Stranmillis University College.

Domestic teams

Ballymoney
McKeever played senior club field hockey for Ballymoney, playing in various competitions including the Ulster Shield, the Irish Senior Cup
and the Women's Irish Hockey League.
Her team mates at Ballymoney have included Angela Platt, Megan Frazer and Katie Mullan. McKeever played for Ballymoney during 2016–17 Women's Irish Hockey League season.

Ireland international
McKeever was first called up for a senior Ireland squad in June 2003 and in July 2003 she made her full debut against Japan. Between 2003 and 2010 she made 150 senior appearances for Ireland. In February 2008 McKeever captained Ireland as she made her 100th senior appearance against China. She also captained Ireland when she made her final appearance against Australia in July 2010.

Teacher and coach
In 2006 McKeever began working as a PE teacher at Dalriada School. She also coached at Ballymoney. McKeever mentored Katie Mullan at both Dalriada and Ballymoney.

Honours
Ballymoney
Irish Senior Cup
Winners: 2000–01
Runners-up: 2004–05, 2007–08
Ulster Shield
Winners: 2010–11, 2012–13
Runners-up: 2001–02, 2004–05, 2005–06, 2007–08

References

1983 births
Living people
Ireland international women's field hockey players
Female field hockey players from Northern Ireland
Irish female field hockey players
British female field hockey players
Irish field hockey coaches
Women's Irish Hockey League players
People educated at Dalriada School
People from Ballymoney
Sportspeople from County Antrim
Schoolteachers from Northern Ireland
Alumni of Stranmillis University College